Oz and James's Big Wine Adventure is a BBC television programme of which two series have been broadcast. It was presented by wine expert Oz Clarke and motoring journalist James May (at the time, a presenter of Top Gear), with Clarke aiming to educate May (a committed bitter drinker) about wine while undertaking a road trip. The first season focused on France and the second on California. The sequel series Oz and James Drink to Britain, broadcast in 2009, made the change to a focus on the variety of beverages available in the United Kingdom.

Concept
Although technical at times, the programme was light in tone, and much of its entertainment stems from the dynamic of personality clashes between the wine connoisseur, Clarke, and the more pragmatic May whom Clarke at one point described as "an utter scruff" (this was in contrast to May's position as "the gentleman" of the three presenters on Top Gear).

May acts the part of a difficult student and often behaved rude and grumpily, more interested in drinking wine than in talking about it. When he determined that Clarke rambled on pompously, he blew on a whistle, which he called the "Ozillator."  At the start of the series, May declared he likes to drink wine, but knows little about it. Clarke teaches him the basics about smells and texture and about grape varieties, showing him how wine is made, what wine goes with what food and exposed May to the culture surrounding wine. They visited various types of winemakers, from those who make wine in small sheds to prestigious producers. Clarke frequently quizzed May, and May gave Clarke challenges. Ultimately, May does pick up some knowledge.

First series
The first series focused on French wine and was first broadcast in the autumn of 2006. Over several weeks, Clarke and May travelled around France's wine regions in a 1989 Jaguar XJ-S convertible that had been modernized by Knowles-Wilkins Engineering.

Repeats on commercial digital channels have split the extended-length (54 minute) first episode into two parts (each focusing on one region) for ease of scheduling, making a six-episode series suitable for broadcast in a set half-hour time slot.

In the United States, it was broadcast on BBC America as  "James May's Road Trip" in 2011, running immediately after Top Gear.

Second series
Clarke and May travelled through California sampling local wines and meet winemakers, travelling north from Venice Beach to the Napa Valley. The chosen vehicle of this series was a Monaco motorhome, and in some episodes, a Ford Mustang and a Mini.

Third series

The following series, retitled Oz and James Drink to Britain, aired on BBC Two on 6 January 2009. This series featured the duo driving around the United Kingdom in a 1982 Rolls-Royce Corniche, in an effort to discover the wide variety of drinks on offer to Britons. For this series, they visited Camel Valley vineyard in Cornwall, but the beverages were no longer limited to wine, with the very first drink consumed a pint of Yorkshire bitter.

Tie-in products

DVDs
 Oz and James's Big Wine Adventure: Complete BBC Series One (2006)
 Oz and James's Big Wine Adventure: Complete BBC Series Two – California (2007)
 Oz and James's Big Wine Adventure: Complete BBC Series One & Two Box Set (2008)
 Oz and James Drink to Britain: Complete Series Three (2009)

These titles are all distributed by Acorn Media UK.

Books
 Oz and James's Big Wine Adventure, Clarke, Oz; May, James (2006). London: BBC Books. 
 Oz and James Drink to Britain, Clarke, Oz; May, James (2009). Pavilion Books.

References

External links
 
 Big Wine Adventure official site

Big Wine Adventure
2007 British television series endings
2006 British television series debuts
BBC television documentaries
English-language television shows
Television series about wine